Clannad in Concert is the first live album by Irish folk band  Clannad, released in 1979 by Ogham Records. It was recorded at unknown location during their 1978 tour of Switzerland, during which the group decided to continue with the band full time. The LP came in a gatefold cover and early copies of the Irish issue included a large poster.

Track listing
 "Bean an Tí (Ó Bhean an Tí)" – 3:00
 "Fairies Hornpipe/Off to California" – 3:20
 "A Neansaí Mhíle Grá" – 4:45
 "Mháire Bhruineall" – 1:08
 "Planxty Burke" – 3:42
 "An Giobóg" – 2:10
 "Down by the Sally Gardens" – 4:36
 "Níl Sé Ina Lá (Níl Sé'n Lá)" – 10:20

Personnel

Band
 Ciarán Ó Braonáin – bass, guitar, keyboards, vocals, piano (electric), mandolin
 Máire Ní Bhraonáin – vocals, harp
 Pól Ó Braonáin – flute, guitar, percussion, bongos, vocals, whistles, human whistle
 Noel Ó Dúgáin – guitar, vocals
 Pádraig Ó Dúgáin – guitar, mandola, mandolin, vocals

Production
 Nicky Ryan – producer, engineer

Notes

Clannad albums
1979 live albums